Mohammad Monem Munna (9 June 1966 – 12 February 2005) was a Bangladeshi footballer who mainly played as a center back. He is often regarded as the best defender that ever played for Bangladesh. He is well known by his surname "King-Back".

Early life
Munna started playing football through his school team, Narayanganj Zilla School, which became the champions in the National School Championship, where he was adjudged the best player. He then played for Sirajuddoullah Club of Narayanganj. He started his career in Dhaka through Pioneer Division team Gulistan Club in 1981. In 1982, he moved to the second division team of Shantinagar.

Club career
Munna came in the limelight at first in 1982 during a match between Narayanganj and Bangladesh National team. He joined the Muktijoddha Sangsad KC in 1983 and became the second division champion.  During these two seasons, 1984–85, Munna displayed extraordinary skill in the first division on behalf of the Muktijoddha Sangsad. In 1986 he moved to Brothers Union for one season. At that time, Abahani officials came to notice because of his great performance for the Brothers. As a result, he joined Abahani Limited Dhaka in 1987.  In 1991, Munna received a record fee, 20 lakh taka, for Abahani, which was a unique record for the whole of South Asia at that time. He led Abahani for 1993-1995 as captain and won two consecutive titles in 1993 and 1994.

During 1991 and again in 1993, Munna played for Kolkata's East Bengal F.C. Monem Munna was inducted into the East Bengal Club's "Hall of Fame" for his outstanding performance.

Munna later served as the manager (team leader) of Abahani. He earned the Sky Blues premier division league titles both as captain and as manager.

International career

Munna played for Bangladesh national football team from 1986 until 1997. He served as the captain of the national team three times. In 1995, under his leadership, Bangladesh won the 4-nation Tiger Trophy in Myanmar, the first-ever international trophy won by the country. Bangladesh also became runners-up in 1995 SAF games, under his captaincy.

Personal life and health
Munna was married to Yasmin Monem Surovi. Together they had one daughter, Eusra Monem Dania and one son, Azman Salid.

Munna left his football career in 1997 due to kidney complicacy.

On 9 June 2008 the Dhanmondi Road No 8 was officially renamed as the "Monem Munna Bridge" as a remembrance of Monem Munna illustrious career on his 42 birthday.

References

1966 births
2005 deaths
Bangladeshi footballers
Bangladesh international footballers
Footballers from Dhaka
Abahani Limited (Dhaka) players
East Bengal Club players
Brothers Union players
Muktijoddha Sangsad KC players
Association football central defenders
Footballers at the 1986 Asian Games
Footballers at the 1990 Asian Games
Recipients of the Bangladesh National Sports Award
Asian Games competitors for Bangladesh
Bangladeshi expatriate footballers
Bangladeshi expatriate sportspeople in India
South Asian Games silver medalists for Bangladesh
South Asian Games bronze medalists for Bangladesh
People from Narayanganj District
Calcutta Football League players